Hammouda Youssef Sabbagh (born 10 February 1959) is a Syrian politician who has been the Speaker of the People's Council of Syria since September 2017. He is the first Syriac Orthodox Christian to have held the post, and overall the second Christian to hold that post since Fares al-Khoury. He was elected speaker of parliament with 193 votes out of 252.

In January 2019, Sabbagh considered the campaigns on social media criticizing the regime and its government to be controlled by anonymous third parties.

See also
 Christianity in Syria

References

Members of the Regional Command of the Arab Socialist Ba'ath Party – Syria Region
Living people
Speakers of the People's Assembly of Syria
1959 births
Syrian Christians
Syriac Orthodox Christians